Briscoe is a small unincorporated community in Lincoln County, Missouri, United States.

The community sits on the east bank of the North Fork of the Cuivre River at the end of Missouri Route K two miles west of US Route 61. The community of Davis is 1.5 miles south along the river and Silex is 3.5 miles to the northwest.

History
Briscoe was platted in 1883. The community was named after Samuel Briscoe, the original owner of the town site. A post office called Briscoe was established in 1882, and remained in operation until 1959.

References

Unincorporated communities in Missouri
Unincorporated communities in Lincoln County, Missouri